The Deadly Bees  is a 1966 British horror film based on H.F. Heard's 1941 novel A Taste for Honey.  It was directed by Freddie Francis, and stars Suzanna Leigh, Guy Doleman, and Frank Finlay. The original screenplay was by Robert Bloch but was rewritten by Anthony Marriott. The film was released theatrically in the United States in 1967 and was featured in a 1998 episode of Mystery Science Theater 3000.

Heard's novel, which was a sort of Sherlock Holmes pastiche, had been previously adapted for television as a 60-minute drama episode of The Elgin Hour: Season 1, Episode 11 under the title "Sting of Death" (22 February 1955), starring Boris Karloff as the detective character from Heard's novel, Mr Mycroft. According to H.F. Heard's official website, kinescopes of this TV dramatization survive, and, in 2014, it was made commercially available for home video as one of several features in a DVD, released by Synergy Entertainment, titled Sherlock Holmes - The Archive Collection - Volume One.

Plot 
The film opens with two men from an unnamed ministry commenting on a spate of letters from a beekeeper claiming to have developed a strain of killer bees. They dismiss him as a lunatic, though his letters claim he will start killing people if he is not taken seriously.

Meanwhile, pop singer Vicki Robbins (Suzanna Leigh) collapses from exhaustion on television, and is sent to recuperate in a cottage on Seagull Island. This was chosen because her doctor knows Ralph Hargrove. The proprietors of the "rest home" are a depressed, disgruntled couple, Ralph and Mary Hargrove (Guy Doleman and Catherine Finn).  Ralph is a beekeeper, as is his neighbor, H.W. Manfred (Frank Finlay).

Vicki begins to notice mysterious happenings. Mary Hargrove's dog and later Mary herself are attacked by the bees and killed, leading Vicki to suspect Hargrove. She and Manfred start to snoop around. Manfred keeps his bees in an apiary within his home, behind a pair of doors, which open to view the bees. He claims to control them via a tape-recording of a high note made by a death's-head moth, which hypnotizes the bees. He encourages her to search through Hargrove's papers, and she discovers that Hargrove has managed to isolate "the smell of fear" into a liquid form.  Manfred tells her this must mean that Hargrove has been baiting the bees with this substance. Manfred then goes away seemingly innocently and heroically to Hargrove's house, apparently to get her luggage and a copy of a book. There he asks for Vicki's luggage and to borrow a copy of "Beekeeping through the Ages," a book he seemed to have authored in another version? Vicki finds this and realizes Manfred might be somehow suspicious. Hargrove replies stiffly when he offers to return it, "Keep it." While Hargrove gets the book, after dumping out her luggage for Manfred at his farm, Manfred sneaks in behind him and plants the bee attack scent on Hargrove's jacket. When Hargrove returns with the book, the audience sees the door open a crack, when Hargrove had shut it behind him, when he went in to get the book. Apparently he doesn't notice it, as a clue Manfred had snuck in behind his back.

Vicki's snooping doesn't go unnoticed; bees soon attack her in her room at the cottage. She eventually escapes to Manfred's house, where she decides to stay until she can catch the next boat off the island. When Manfred acts suspiciously, Vicki snoops some more and discovers his secret laboratory, and he admits that he has been causing all of this. He adds that he had intended to kill Hargrove all along, but now that she knows the secret, he must kill her too. She thwarts his attempt, leading him to be stung to death and crash through the banister. She sets fire to the house, escapes, and leaves the island the next day, just as a bowler-hatted ministry official finally arrives to investigate the deaths. Later bees swarm and attack the pubmaster who doubles as a constable apparently, investigating the Hargrove place. The pubmaster grabs Hargove's jacket unwittingly and foolishly and the bees attack him not Hargrove. He thinks Hargrove is trying to kill him (the prevailing theory is Hargrove is the suspicious one as his inquiry turned up little and they didn't vote to destroy his hives), but Hargove chases after him with a smoker, and saves him by telling him to throw away the jacket. The bees then attack the jacket. Hargrove then reveals that the culprit is Manfred who's a "homicidal" maniac and that the coat being scented was from Manfred who was trying to kill him, Hargrove. Hargrove and the pubmaster rush over to Manfred's and see the house on fire. They rescue Vicki in the nick of time who was locked inside the house by Manfred, and she's pushed up next to the door, with the body of the dead Manfred before her, stung and burnt to death having fallen over a collapsed staircase. Hargrove breaks down the door and the pubmaster smashes the window and they rescue Vicki just in the nick of time. Hargrove turns around at the last minute from being the prime suspect to the hero.

Cast 
 Suzanna Leigh as Vicki Robbins
 Frank Finlay as H.W. Manfred
 Guy Doleman as Ralph Hargrove
 Catherine Finn as Mary Hargrove
 John Harvey as Thompson
 Michael Ripper as David Hawkins
 Anthony Bailey as Compere
 Tim Barrett as Harcourt
 James Cossins as Coroner
 Frank Forsyth as Doctor
 Katy Wild as Doris Hawkins
 Greta Farrer as Sister
 Gina Gianelli as Secretary
 Michael Gwynn as Dr. George Lang
 Maurice Good as Agent

The television sequence toward the beginning features a performance by British pop group The Birds (not to be confused with American group The Byrds). The group's lead guitarist is Ronnie Wood (later of The Faces and The Rolling Stones) and the sequence was filmed on 14 January 1966 at Shepperton Studios.

Production 

Though the script was originally adapted from Heard's novel by noted author Robert Bloch, best known for Psycho, critics invariably derided the film, citing its uninspired acting, ludicrous special effects (including plastic flies glued to actors' faces to show them being "stung"), and continuity errors.

Bloch blamed the film's poor showing on the fact he wrote it for Christopher Lee and Boris Karloff (to reprise his performance from the TV version), who were both unavailable due to scheduling difficulties; and on the fact that director Freddie Francis and writer Anthony Marriott had decided to 'improve' Bloch's script. Bloch's screenplay featured Mr Mycroft from Heard's novel; this character was removed under instruction from Amicus. According to Bloch: "I still felt the story and characters strong enough to warrant preservation, and tried to retain as much of the basic plot and atmosphere as possible, working with a synopsisation Milton Subotsky provided...I did put my kindly old villain in a wheelchair - which made the part right for Boris Karloff of course - and my red herring character was designed for Christopher Lee. But while the producers were away...the director decided to improve my work; besides, Karloff and Lee were too expensive anyway...My concept was a far cry from what emerged as Frank Finlay's part. When the script was re-written the result was, in my opinion, a hybrid affair with no inner consistency or logical story-line: the bees were menacing but the characters were not. I'm sure that if Freddie Francis and I could have...discussed our disparate approaches we might well have come to an agreement which could have resulted in a stronger film; unfortunately, that wasn't feasible...as with Caligari and The Couch, I shudder every time this item is mentioned or shown...Everything in pre-production had been planned for it, and they didn't have the money to scrap all the preproduction sets, so they had to go ahead...That came off I think rather badly. This is no reflection on Anthony Marriott, the writer who took my script over there and did the rewrites. He did what he was told, and I'm sure he's a very competent man, but it didn't come off in the slightest as I had written it."

Bloch wrote in his autobiography: "Once the completed screenplay arrived in England, the problem of matching stellar schedules - and salaries - put the roles into other hands and the script itself into the hands of its director. As is often the case, he decided to improve it, with the aid of a writer called Anthony Marriott, but apparently without the knowledge of Rosenberg and Subotsky [Amicus Films' producers], who left prior to production. Both of them had liked my original version, but by the time they returned, the screenplay had been improved past recognition and the shoot was already beginning. Sometime during 1966 the film was released under a new title [which implies Bloch's script was titled, as the novel was, A Taste for Honey] The Deadly Bees. As such it soon buzzed off into critical oblivion, unwept, unhonoured and unstung." Bloch is reputed to have been so annoyed by the interference with his script that he never bothered to see the completed film.

Critical reception 
 Allmovie gave the film a negative review, writing, "there's little in Bees worth watching."
 Referencing The Birds, the New York Times regretted "Mr. Hitchcock would never have sanctioned a sloppy, raucously framed little thriller like this"

DVD/Blu-Ray
The Deadly Bees was released on DVD and Blu-ray on 27 October 2015, in 1.78:1 aspect ratio, by Olive Films, under license from Paramount Pictures.

References

External links 

 
 
 
 
 The Monster Shack's review

1966 films
1966 horror films
British science fiction horror films
1960s science fiction horror films
British natural horror films
Fictional bees
Films about bees
Amicus Productions films
Paramount Pictures films
Films based on British novels
Films with screenplays by Robert Bloch
1960s English-language films
1960s British films